Hana Kuyō–Sanbyaku Rokujū Go Nichi Koi Moyō (花供養・365日恋もよう), literally meaning "Flower Festival - 365 Days of Love", is the seventh studio album by Japanese singer Sayuri Ishikawa.  The album was released on November 25, 1976 by Nippon Columbia. All twelve songs in the album are original songs written for Ishikawa by Yu Aku as lyricist and Takashi Miki (三木たかし) as composer and arranger.

Hana Kuyō–Sanbyaku Rokujū Go Nichi Koi Moyō is a concept album.  Each of the twelve songs in the album represents a month of a year.  In addition, most songs depict scenes of a particular place in Japan while some are not specific about its location.

Ishikawa’s signature song "Tsugaru Kaikyō Fuyugeshiki" originally appeared as the song representing the month of December in this album.  Prior to the release of this album, Ishikawa sang "Tsugaru Kaikyō Fuyugeshiki" on stage at her recital in Osaka. This first presentation of the song received critical acclaim, which led to the song’s subsequent release as a single in the following year.

The album was originally released in 30 cm LP format.  It was reprinted in 12 cm CD format in 1993 by Nippon Columbia.

Track listing

Time of each song is from the CD reprint.  The sleeve of the original LP album does not have time of the songs.

Singles
"Hana Kuyō" (花供養 Flower Festival), also the main title of the album, was originally released as the fourteenth single by Ishikawa.

"Tsugaru Kaikyō Fuyugeshiki" was released as Ishikawa’s fifteenth single following the release of the album.

Personnel
The album sleeve does not credit people other than singer Ishikawa and writers Aku and Miki.

Notes 

1976 albums
Sayuri Ishikawa albums